The 1977–78 FTU Knights men's basketball team was an NCAA Division II college basketball team that represented Florida Technological University, now named the University of Central Florida. The Knights competed in the Sunshine State Conference (SSC), and played their home games in the university's education gymnasium on FTU's main campus in Orlando, Florida. The team was led by head coach Torchy Clark who was in his ninth season with the team.

In the previous year, the Knights finished the season 24–4, 8–2 in SSC play. In 1978, Clark led the Knights, which at the time were riding a 24–game winning streak, to a Sunshine State Conference regular season title, the inaugural Sunshine State Conference post-season tournament title, and the NCAA South Regional and the NCAA Quarterfinals titles, en route to the Final Four in Springfield, Missouri. It was one of six tournament appearances that the Knights made between 1976 and 1982. Due to the team's impressive performance, Clark was named the Sunshine State Conference Coach of the Year. To this date, the teams 24–game winning streak and 26 total wins are still program records.

Schedule and results

|-
!colspan=7| Regular season

|-
!colspan=7| Sunshine State Conference Tournament
|-

|-
!colspan=7| NCAA Tournament
|-

|-
| colspan="8" | *Non-Conference Game.
|}

References

UCF Knights men's basketball seasons
Ftu
UCF Knights
UCF Knights